The 1987–88 Florida State Seminoles men's basketball team represented Florida State University in the program's final season as members of the Metro Conference during the 1987–88 NCAA Division I men's basketball season. Led by head coach Pat Kennedy, the Seminoles reached the NCAA tournament as the No. 12 seed in the West region. Florida State was beaten in the first round by No. 5 seed Iowa. The team finished with an overall record of 19–11 (7–5 Metro).

Roster

Schedule

|-
!colspan=9 style=| Regular Season

|-
!colspan=9 style=| Metro Conference tournament

|-
!colspan=9 style=| NCAA tournament

Rankings

References

Florida State Seminoles men's basketball seasons
1987 in sports in Florida
1988 in sports in Florida
Florida State
Florida State